is a former Japanese football player.

Playing career
Iizuka was born in Shizuoka Prefecture on April 4, 1978. After graduating from Shizuoka Gakuen High School, he joined Japan Football League club Montedio Yamagata in 1997. The club was promoted to J2 League from 1999. However he could not play many matches and retired end of 1999 season.

Club statistics

References

External links

1978 births
Living people
Association football people from Shizuoka Prefecture
Japanese footballers
J2 League players
Japan Football League (1992–1998) players
Montedio Yamagata players
Association football midfielders